Mélanie Charles (born 17 April 1980) is an Australian team handball player. She plays for Handball West, and is part of the Australia women's national beach handball team (beach handball) also known as the Beach Gliders.

Indoor handball 
She was part of the Western Australia state team for the Australian championships in 2013, 2014 and 2015 and contributed to obtaining a bronze medal in 2015.

Beach handball 
She has been part of the Western Australian state team since 2011 and contributed to winning a bronze medal in 2014 and 2012.
In 2017, she joined the Queensland state team and contributed to winning a silver medal for the Australian Beach Handball Championships 2017.

International beach handball 
Currently selected in the Australian team for the 2017 World Games, she was part of the Australian team that secured an 8th position at World Championships in Hungary, July 2016 and also participated to the World Championships 2014 in Brazil.

References

External links
http://www.beachhandballaustralia.com/aussie-beach-gliders
http://www.handballaustralia.com.au

Australian female handball players
1980 births
Living people